Didier Bezace (10 February 1946 – 11 March 2020) was a French actor.

Life and career
Theatre student at the International Dramatic University Centre in Nancy, Didier Bezace received lessons from Bernard Drot, Jean-Marie Patte, Gilles Sandier, María Casares and Henri Gourbion.

Co-founder with Jean-Louis Benoît and Jacques Nichet of the theatre of l'Aquarium-Cartoucherie de Vincennes, he participated in all the shows that the company produced as author, stager and actor. Didier Bezace was the director of the théâtre de La Commune in Aubervilliers since 1997 and continued to act in cinema and television.

2005 works
 Avis aux intéressés by Daniel Keene
 With Séverine Magois, he was honoured with a Molière for his production of La Version de Browning by Terence Rattigan, for "best adaptation of a foreign work".

He staged works by Georges Feydeau, Emmanuel Bove, and Molière whose (The School for Wives) opened the Festival d'Avignon in July 2001.

Other work included La Femme changée en renard by David Garnett, Pereira prétend by Antonio Tabucchi...

In cinema, he worked with Claude Miller (La Petite Voleuse), Bertrand Tavernier, Jeanne Labrune, Anne Théron, Valérie Guignabodet, Claude Zidi and Rémi Bezançon.

In television, he can be seen in Les Thibault, Sissi and recently in Mon fils d'ailleurs.

He was also in the film Le Pressentiment, working with Jean-Pierre Darroussin based on the novel by Emmanuel Bove (Released in October 2006).

2006 pieces at the Théâtre de La Commune  Objet perdu: 3 short pieces from memory, crying, recital, violin by Daniel Keene, Festival of here and now by Daniel Keene.

2006-2007 season
Themes of 'Mothers' with La Maman bohême based on Médée by Dario Fo and Franca Rame and May by Hanif Kureishi

Filmography
 1976 : Guerres civiles en France, sketch Premier Empire by François Barat
 1988 : The Little Thief by Claude Miller
 1989 : Dédé by Jean-Louis Benoît
 1991 : Sur la terre comme au ciel by Marion Hänsel
 1991 : L.627 by Bertrand Tavernier
 1992 : Taxi de nuit by Serge Leroy
 1993 : Petits arrangements avec les morts by Pascale Ferran
 1993 : Profil bas by Claude Zidi
 1995 : Les Voleurs by André Téchiné
 1997 : La Femme de chambre du Titanic by Bigas Luna
 1998 : Le Plus beau pays du monde by Marcel Bluwal
 1998 : La Dilettante by Pascal Thomas
 1998 : Ça commence aujourd'hui by Bertrand Tavernier
 1999 : Voyous voyelles by Serge Meynard
 1999 : La Face cachée de la lune (La otra cara de la luna) by Lluis Josep Comeron
 2000 : Ça ira mieux demain by Jeanne Labrune
 2001 : Ceci est mon corps by Rodolphe Marconi
 2002 : C'est le bouquet! by Jeanne Labrune
 2002 : Nuit noire by Daniel Colas (uncredited)
 2003 : Mariages ! by Valérie Guignabodet
 2003 : Ce qu'ils imaginent by Anne Théron
 2004 : Cause toujours ! by Jeanne Labrune
 2005 : Ma vie en l'air by Rémi Bezançon
 2006 : Le Pressentiment by Jean-Pierre Darroussin
 2011 : The Minister
 2016 : The Origin of Violence

Television
 2005 : La Belle et le sauvage by Bertrand Arthuys
 2006 : Les Camarades by François Luciani
 2007 : Les Liens du sang by Régis Musset : Juge Dugourd

References

1946 births
2020 deaths
Male actors from Paris
French male film actors
French male television actors
French male stage actors
20th-century French male actors
21st-century French male actors